The Fort Smith Metropolitan Statistical Area, as defined by the United States Census Bureau, is a five-county area including three Arkansas counties and two Oklahoma counties, and anchored by the city of Fort Smith, Arkansas. The total MSA population in 2000 was 273,170 people, estimated by the Bureau to have grown to 289,693 people by 2007.

Other major cities located within the area include the Arkansas cities of Van Buren and Ozark and the Oklahoma cities of Poteau and Sallisaw. It is directly positioned under Crawford County in the western part of Arkansas.

Counties
Constituent counties of the MSA include:

Arkansas
 Sebastian County
 Crawford County
 Franklin County

Oklahoma
 Le Flore County
 Sequoyah County

Communities
Communities are categorized based on their populations in the 2000 U.S. Census.

Places with more than 75,000 inhabitants
 Fort Smith, Arkansas (Principal city)

Places with 10,000 to 25,000 inhabitants
 Van Buren, Arkansas

Places with 1,000 to 10,000 inhabitants
 Alma, Arkansas
 Arkoma, Oklahoma
 Barling, Arkansas
 Cedarville, Arkansas
 Charleston, Arkansas
 Greenwood, Arkansas
 Heavener, Oklahoma
 Lavaca, Arkansas
 Mansfield, Arkansas (partial)
 Mulberry, Arkansas
 Muldrow, Oklahoma
 Ozark, Arkansas
 Panama, Oklahoma
 Pocola, Oklahoma
 Poteau, Oklahoma
 Roland, Oklahoma
 Sallisaw, Oklahoma
 Spiro, Oklahoma
 Talihina, Oklahoma
 Vian, Oklahoma
 Wister, Oklahoma

Places with 500 to 1,000 inhabitants
 Bonanza, Arkansas
 Brent, Oklahoma (census-designated place)
 Brushy, Oklahoma (census-designated place)
 Carlisle, Oklahoma (census-designated place)
 Central City, Arkansas
 Dyer, Arkansas
 Gore, Oklahoma
 Hackett, Arkansas
 Hartford, Arkansas
 Howe, Oklahoma
 Huntington, Arkansas
 Kibler, Arkansas
 Mountainburg, Arkansas
 Rock Island, Oklahoma
 Shady Point, Oklahoma

Places with fewer than 500 inhabitants
 Akins, Oklahoma (census-designated place)
 Altus, Arkansas
 Belfonte, Oklahoma (census-designated place)
 Bokoshe, Oklahoma
 Branch, Arkansas
 Cameron, Oklahoma
 Cecil, Arkansas
 Chester, Arkansas
 Cowlington, Oklahoma
 Denning, Arkansas
 Dwight Mission, Oklahoma (census-designated place)
 Evening Shade, Oklahoma (census-designated place)
 Fanshawe, Oklahoma (partial)
 Flute Springs, Oklahoma (census-designated place)
 Fort Coffee, Oklahoma
 Gans, Oklahoma
 Le Flore, Oklahoma
 Long, Oklahoma (census-designated place)
 Marble City Community, Oklahoma (census-designated place)
 Marble City, Oklahoma
 McKey, Oklahoma (census-designated place)
 Midland, Arkansas
 Moffett, Oklahoma
 Notchietown, Oklahoma (census-designated place)
 Paradise Hill, Oklahoma
 Pinhook Corners, Oklahoma (census-designated place)
 Redbird Smith, Oklahoma (census-designated place)
 Remy, Oklahoma (census-designated place)
 Rudy, Arkansas
 Short, Oklahoma (census-designated place)
 Stony Point, Oklahoma (census-designated place)
 Sycamore, Sequoyah County, Oklahoma (census-designated place)
 Wiederkehr Village, Arkansas

Unincorporated places
 Big Cedar, Oklahoma
 Dora, Arkansas
 Figure Five, Arkansas
 Hodgen, Oklahoma
 Monroe, Oklahoma
 Muse, Oklahoma
 Skullyville, Oklahoma
 Whitesboro, Oklahoma

Largest cities in the MSA

Demographics

As of the census of 2000, there were 273,170 people, 104,506 households, and 75,005 families residing within the MSA. The racial makeup of the MSA was 82.78% White, 3.46% African American, 5.80% Native American, 1.80% Asian, 0.04% Pacific Islander, 2.26% from other races, and 3.87% from two or more races. Hispanic or Latino of any race were 4.54% of the population.

The median income for a household in the MSA was $30,500, and the median income for a family was $35,902. Males had a median income of $28,074 versus $20,182 for females. The per capita income for the MSA was $15,039.

See also
 Arkansas metropolitan areas
 Arkansas census statistical areas
 Oklahoma census statistical areas

References

 
Metropolitan areas of Arkansas
Metropolitan areas of Oklahoma